The Union Pacific Challengers are a type of simple articulated 4-6-6-4 steam locomotive built by American Locomotive Company (ALCO) from 1936 to 1944 and operated by the Union Pacific Railroad until the late 1950s.

A total of 105 Challengers were built in five classes. They operated over most of the Union Pacific system, primarily in freight service, but a few were assigned to the Portland Rose and other passenger trains. Their design and operating experience shaped the design of the Big Boy locomotive type, which in turn shaped the design of the last three orders of Challengers.

Two Union Pacific Challengers survive. The most notable is Union Pacific No. 3985, which was restored by the Union Pacific in 1981, then operated in excursion service as part of its heritage fleet program. Mechanical problems forced it out of service in October 2010; it was retired in January 2020 after the restoration of the 4-8-8-4 Big Boy 4014 and eventually donated to the Railroading Heritage of Midwest America in 2022, where the locomotive is undergoing a second restoration. The only other surviving Challenger is UP No. 3977, which is on display in North Platte, Nebraska.

History

Description
The name "Challenger" was given to steam locomotives with a 4-6-6-4 wheel arrangement: four wheels in the leading pilot truck to guide the locomotive into curves, two sets of six driving wheels, and four trailing wheels to support the rear of the engine and its massive firebox. Each set of driving wheels is driven by two steam cylinders. In essence, the result is two engines under one boiler. Union Pacific developed five types of Challengers: the "light" CSA-1 and CSA-2 classes and the "heavy" 4664–3, 4664–4, and 4664-5 classes.

The railroad sought powerful locomotives that could handle mountain grades at high speeds. Previously, articulated locomotives had been limited to slow speeds by their design. Technical breakthroughs allowed the UP Challengers to operate with  boiler pressure, something usually reserved for passenger locomotives like the FEF Series. They had  drivers, mammoth wheels usually seen on passenger locomotives only because freight engines normally require the extra torque provided by smaller wheels.

When the first Challengers entered service in 1936, on the UP's main line over the Wasatch Range between Green River and Ogden, the locomotives had problems climbing the steep grades. For most of the route, the maximum grade is 0.82% in either direction, but the climb eastward from Ogden, into the Wasatch Range, reached 1.14%. Hauling a  freight train demanded double heading and helper operations, and adding and removing helper engines slowed operations. Those limitations prompted the introduction of the Big Boy in 1941, as well as a redesign of the last three orders from 1942 to 1944.

Using the experience from the Big Boy, UP chief mechanical engineer, Otto Jabelmann, redesigned the last three orders of Challengers in 1941. The result was a locomotive in working order weighing some  accompanied by a tender weighing  when 2/3 loaded. From 1941, the Challengers were intended to speed up freight operations on the grades across Wyoming; the Wasatch Range climb east from Ogden was to be conquered by the Big Boys without helpers.

Construction
The 105 locomotives were ordered in five batches: the first two of light Challengers, and the final three of heavy Challengers. Along with the Big Boys, the Challengers arrived on the scene just as traffic was surging in preparation for American participation in World War II.

As part of Union Pacific's fourth order in 1943, ALCO built thirty-one locomotives for Union Pacific using the same specifications. However, the War Production Board diverted six locomotives after completion to the Denver and Rio Grande Western Railroad via a lease through the War Department's Defense Plant Corporation. Locomotives 3900-3905 formed the Rio Grande's Class L-97. These were later sold to Clinchfield Railroad in 1947 and were renumbered as 670–675, where they formed the Clinchfield's Class E-3.

Preservation
Only two Challengers survive, both from the 4664-4 order built in 1943. No. 3977 is on static display in North Platte, Nebraska. No. 3985 was restored to operating condition by Union Pacific in 1981 and used in excursion service until mechanical problems sent it back into storage in October 2010. It was officially retired in January 2020 and is stored in Cheyenne, Wyoming, but has since been acquired by the Railroading Heritage of Midwest America (RRHMA) in Little Silvis Shops in Silvis, Illinois, where the locomotive is now being restored to operation once again.

See also
Union Pacific Big Boy
Union Pacific FEF Series

References

Bibliography

Further reading

External links
 Union Pacific Steam Shop Information on locomotives and excursion schedules.
 UP 3985 Challenger, Steam Locomotive - photos and additional information

Union Pacific Railroad locomotives
ALCO locomotives
Simple articulated locomotives
Standard gauge locomotives of the United States
Railway locomotives introduced in 1936